Royal Navy Air Station Rattray or RNAS Rattray (HMS Merganser) and also known as Crimond Airfield, Crimond Aerodrome or Rattray Aerodrome was a Royal Naval Air Station near Crimond, Aberdeenshire.

History

The station started to be built from March 1943, with 774 Naval Air Squadron moving in from July 1943 for Telegraphist Air Gunners training but the site was not commissioned until 3 October 1944.

The base then switched to training Torpedo Bombing Reconnaissance crews.

The following units were here at some point:

 708 Naval Air Squadron:
 714 Naval Air Squadron (May 1944-unknown)
 717 Naval Air Squadron (November 1944-unknown)
 753 Naval Air Squadron
 766 Naval Air Squadron
 769 Naval Air Squadron
 774 Naval Air Squadron (July 1943-August 1945)
 815 Naval Air Squadron
 817 Naval Air Squadron
 818 Naval Air Squadron
 821 Naval Air Squadron
 825 Naval Air Squadron

The base was closed in 1946, being moved into a state of care & maintenance. It was also used as a Royal Naval Wireless Station until 2004.

Current use

The site is home to a high frequency transmitter station forming part of the Defence High Frequency Communications Service. The station is operated by Babcock International Group on behalf of the Ministry of Defence.

See also
List of air stations of the Royal Navy
 24 February – Royal Navy submarine  is lost with all 37 crew on sea trials in the Sound of Bute; she would not be located until 1994.
 27 March – Royal Navy escort carrier  is destroyed by an accidental explosion in the Firth of Clyde, killing 379 of the crew of 528.
 30 May – Royal Navy submarine  is lost with all hands on a training exercise in the Firth of Clyde.
 30 November –  is launched at John Brown & Company's shipyard at Clydebank by the Princess Elizabeth. The Royal Navy's largest, fastest and last battleship, she was laid down in October 1941 and will be in commission from 1946-60.

References

Citations

Bibliography

External links

WWII base information

Royal Navy bases in Scotland
Transport in Aberdeenshire
Royal Naval Air Stations in Scotland